Honey bucket may refer to:

Sanitation systems
Different sorts of toilets, for example:
 Bucket toilet
 Chemical toilet, a toilet which collects human excreta in a container and uses chemicals to minimize odors
 Portable toilet, a movable toilet used in a variety of situations

Other
 A bucket of honey (see beekeeping)
Honey Bucket (musical group), a band from Portland, Oregon
 "Honey Bucket" (song) – a 1993 song by The Melvins